The North East Times is CA-certified widely circulated English daily newspaper in the entire North Eastern region of India. It was launched by GL Publications Ltd. on October 2, 1990. The current circulation figure of the daily is 1,13,000.

See also
List of Assamese periodicals

References

English-language newspapers published in India
Newspapers published in Assam
Publications established in 1990
1990 establishments in Assam